The 1985 African Championships in Athletics were held in Cairo, Egypt between 15 and 18 August.

Medal summary

Men's events

Women's events

Medal table

See also
1985 in athletics (track and field)

Notes

External links
Results – GBR Athletics
Medallists
 

A
African Championships in Athletics
International athletics competitions hosted by Egypt
African
African Championships in Athletics
1980s in Cairo
Sports competitions in Cairo
Athletics in Cairo